
Year 111 BC was a year of the pre-Julian Roman calendar. At the time it was known as the Year of the Consulship of Serapio and Bestia (or, less frequently, year 643 Ab urbe condita) and the Sixth Year of Yuanding. The denomination 111 BC for this year has been used since the early medieval period, when the Anno Domini calendar era became the prevalent method in Europe for naming years.

Events 
 By place 

 Roman Republic 
 The city of Rome is devastated by fire.
 Jugurtha, king of Numidia, bribes the commander Lucius Calpurnius Bestia and Roman friends to secure easy terms. He is given a safe conduct to Rome in order to account for his actions in the Roman Senate. Jugurtha contemptuously bribes his way through all difficulties.

 China 
 Han conquest of Nanyue
 In winter, the Han general Yang Pu captures Xunxia Gorge and Shimen and defeats the Nanyue army. He and Han general Lu Bode then attack the Nanyue capital Panyu and receive its surrender. Nanyue's King Zhao Jiande and Premier Lü Jia are captured in flight and killed.
 Nanyue's ally Cangwu submits to the Han Dynasty, and Nanyue is divided into nine prefectures. The Han Dynasty thereby extends its control to modern-day North Vietnam.
 Han-Xiongnu War: The Han generals Gongsun He and Zhao Ponu invade deep into Xiongnu territory, Gongsun marching from Wuhuan and Zhao from Lingju. However, neither come upon a Xiongnu army. There follows a period of several years in which the Han and Xiongnu seek to establish peace. 
 Han-Dongyue War
 Autumn - After learning that Yang Pu had suggested an invasion of Dongyue to Emperor Wu of Han, Dongyue's king, Zou Yushan, declares himself 'Emperor Wu' and sends an army under Zou Li to invade Han territory. They capture Baisha, Wulin and Meiling, and the Han Treasurer Zhang Cheng is executed for avoiding the Dongyue army.
 Emperor Wu of Han sends two maritime fleets and three armies, including an army under Yang Pu, to invade Dongyue.

Births 
 Spartacus, Roman slave and rebel leader (d. 71 BC, presumably)

Deaths 
 Tryphaena, queen consort of the Seleucid Empire
 Zhao Jiande, last king of Nanyue (or Nam Viet)

References